Nea Moudania (Néa Moudaniá; often referred to as Moudania (Μουδανιά, Moudaniá), the name of the municipal unit to which the town belongs, is the seat of the municipality of Nea Propontida, Chalkidiki, Greece. The town is 60 km south of Thessaloniki and is the financial and commercial center of Chalkidiki, as well as its most populous town. It was built after 1922 by Greek refugees from Anatolia who wanted to give the settlement the name of their hometown (now Mudanya, Turkey), hence the addition of the word nea, which means new in Greek. Nea Moudania hosts the Department of Fisheries and Aquaculture Technology of the Alexander Technological Educational Institute of Thessaloniki. The town's harbor serves as Thessaloniki's adjuvant.

Sports
POM (Panathletic Association of Moudania) is the only sports club in Nea Moudania, whose football team play in the Delta Ethniki, while the volleyball team play in the A2 Ethniki Volleyball.

Historical Population

See also
List of settlements in Chalkidiki
Apamea Myrlea

Gallery

References

External links

Νέα Μουδανιά blog 
Νέα Μουδανιά agora 
"Nea Moudania Greece Shopping Center Chalkidiki Greece"
Nea Moudania on in-chalkidiki.com
Nea Moudania on holiday.gr
Nea Moudania on gohalkidiki.com
Nea Moudania on www.go2halkidiki.net
KTEL Bus service routes to/from Nea Moudania

Populated places in Chalkidiki